Calder Hall Nuclear Power Station is a former Magnox nuclear power station at Sellafield in Cumbria in North West England. Calder Hall was the world's first full-scale commercial nuclear power station to enter operation, and was the sister plant to the Chapelcross plant in Scotland. Both were commissioned and originally operated by the United Kingdom Atomic Energy Authority. The primary purpose of both plants was to produce weapons-grade plutonium for the UK's nuclear weapons programme, but they also generated electrical power for the National Grid.

Decommissioning‎‎ by Sellafield Ltd started in 2005. The site is partially demolished and is expected to be in save storage by 2027 or later.

Description

Calder Hall nuclear power station was designed by Christopher Hinton, Baron Hinton of Bankside, upon being commissioned by Prime Minister Winston Churchill in 1952, and construction began the following year. 

Calder Hall initially had two cooling towers, with two further added at the opposite end of the power station in 1958 and 1959. The four Magnox (magnesium no oxidation) 180MWth graphite moderated, carbon dioxide cooled nuclear reactors were fuelled by natural abundance uranium enclosed in magnesium-alloy cans. The layout was largely emulated at Chapelcross in 1958, though at Calder Hall, the four units are divided by A and B each with their own turbine hall, unlike Chapelcross where all four units share a turbine hall. The Calder Hall and Chapelcross design was codenamed PIPPA (Pressurised Pile Producing Power and Plutonium) by the UKAEA to denote the plant's dual commercial and military role.

The reactors were supplied by UKAEA, the turbines by C. A. Parsons and Company, and the civil engineering contractor was Taylor Woodrow Construction.

History
Calder Hall was an early development of the existing Windscale site, and due to its size required considerable extension of the site to the south east across the River Calder. It was named after Calder Hall farm, which had farmed the land it was built on, and bridges were built over the River Calder to link to the existing site.   It was divided into two operating units, Calder "A" and Calder "B", each having a turbine hall and two cooling towers shared between reactors 1–2, and reactors 3-4 respectively.

Construction began in 1953 and was carried out by Taylor Woodrow Construction and was completed in 1956. The primary purpose was to produce plutonium for the UK's nuclear weapons programme, for weapons including the WE.177 series. Electricity was always considered to be a by-product.

Calder Hall was officially opened on 17 October 1956 by Queen Elizabeth II. It was initially owned and operated by the Production Group of the United Kingdom Atomic Energy Authority (UKAEA) until the creation of British Nuclear Fuels Limited (BNFL) in 1971. Restructuring by the British government later resulted in a new company, Sellafield Ltd, gaining responsibility for operations of the Sellafield site.

Originally designed for a life of 20 years from respectively 1956-1959, the plant was after 40 years until July 1996 granted an operation licence for a further ten years. Initially, most of the produced heat was used on the site itself for the production of plutonium for nuclear weapons. Its military use, which meant it was shut down for periods of its life, contributed to its long lifetime. Due to embrittlement from years of exposure to radiation, it was decided to close the plant three years sooner than planned.

Closure and decommissioning 
The station was closed on 31 March 2003, the first reactor having been in use for nearly 47 years. Decommissioning started in 2005. The cooling towers were demolished by controlled implosions on 29 September 2007. A period of 12 weeks was required to remove asbestos in the towers' rubble. The reactors were fully defueled in 2019 and fuel was taken across the Sellafield site to be reprocessed within the Magnox Reprocessing Plant. The site is expected to be in save storage by 2027 or later. There were plans for transforming the station into a museum, involving renovating Calder Hall and preserving the towers, but the costs were too high. 

Ownership of all of the site's assets and liabilities was transferred to the Nuclear Decommissioning Authority (NDA), a new regulatory body created by the Energy Act 2004. While operations were transferred from BNFL to Sellafield Ltd.

See also
 Nuclear weapons and the United Kingdom
 Nuclear power in the United Kingdom
 Energy policy of the United Kingdom
 Energy use and conservation in the United Kingdom

References

External links

Calder Hall, Nuclear Engineering International wall chart, October 1956

Former nuclear power stations in England
Former nuclear power stations
Energy infrastructure completed in 1956
Buildings and structures in Cumbria